Mjǫll is a goddess from Norse mythology. She was said to be a descendant of Fornjót and to have three siblings: Dríffa, Fǫnn, and Thorri.

Name 
The name Mjǫll means "fresh, powdery snow" or "fine driving snow" in Old Norse. It is assumed because of this association of her name with snow that she is a goddess of snow.

References 

Norse goddesses